The Chautauqua Circle is an African American women's scholarship and service organization based in Atlanta, Georgia.  Founded in 1913 by Henrietta Curtis Porter, the organization was an offshoot of the larger Chautauqua movement.

References

External links

 

1913 establishments in Georgia (U.S. state)
African-American women's organizations